"Sheena Is a Parasite" is the debut single by English rock band the Horrors, released in April 2006 by Loog Records.

Content 
The title and content were adapted from the Ramones single "Sheena Is a Punk Rocker" as well as the Cramps' "Sheena's in a Goth Gang", and chronicled the demise of punk music and its cultural influence.

The B-side is a cover of the Screaming Lord Sutch song "Jack the Ripper".

Release 
It did not chart, as it contained both stickers and inserts, therefore breaking chart rules.

Music video 
The music video was directed by Chris Cunningham, ending a seven-year music video hiatus for the much respected Cunningham, who admitted to being "mildly obsessed" with the track after coming across it on MySpace. Following several Aphex Twin videos in Cunningham's filmography, the video was expected to be suitably twisted and quirky. The video starred Academy Award nominee Samantha Morton as the song's manic, transmogrifying subject who whipped around like a banshee and spewed her intestines at the camera. Sharply edited and shot on a low budget, the video was instantly banned from MTV UK purely on the basis of the use of strobe lights, not because of the gory subject matter (as was erroneously reported by NME). The video did air on MTV2 in America.

Billboard included the video at No. 14 in its list of "The 15 Scariest Music Videos Ever".

Legacy 
In October 2011, NME placed "Sheena Is a Parasite" at No. 96 on its list "150 Best Tracks of the Past 15 Years".

Track listing 
 "Sheena Is a Parasite"
 "Jack the Ripper"

References

2006 debut singles
The Horrors songs
Music videos directed by Chris Cunningham
2006 songs